Jim Reid may refer to:

 Jim Reid (born 1961), Scottish musician, lead singer of The Jesus and Mary Chain
 Jim Reid (American football) (born 1950), American football player and coach
 Jim Reid (Australian footballer) (1913–1983), Australian rules footballer for Claremont and South Melbourne
 Jim Reid (footballer, born 1912) (1912–1992), Australian rules footballer for North Melbourne
 Jim Reid (basketball) (born 1945), Philadelphia 76ers player
 Jim Reid (Canadian football) (born 1957), Ottawa Rough Riders player
 Jim Reid (folk musician) (1934–2009), Scottish singer/songwriter

See also
 Jim Reed (disambiguation)
 James Reid (disambiguation)
 Jim Read (disambiguation)